The Enchanted Desna is a 1964 Soviet fantasy film, directed by Yuliya Solntseva, based on an autobiographical story by a Ukrainian national writer and cinematographer Oleksandr Dovzhenko. The story depicts his whimsical childhood experiences in a Ukrainian village near the banks of river Desna.

The film won the Special Jury Prize at the San Sebastián International Film Festival.

A scene from the film was used on the cover of "That Joke Isn't Funny Anymore" by The Smiths.

Cast
Boris Andreyev
Yevgeni Bondarenko
Vladimir Goncharov
Zinaida Kiriyenko
Ivan Pereverzev

External links
 The Enchanted Desna at IMDb

References

1964 films
Soviet fantasy films
1960s fantasy films
1960s Russian-language films